Cinema Artists (a/k/a Cinema Artists Philippines) is an independent Filipino motion picture company founded by Lino Brocka and Mike de Leon to produce and distribute the films that Brocka or de Leon directed.

Filmography
 Tinimbang Ka ngunit Kulang (1974)
 Tatlo, Dalawa, Isa (1975) 
 Mortal (1975)
 Maynila: Sa mga Kuko ng Liwanag (1975) 
 Insiang (1976)
 Itim (1976)
 Kay Dali ng Kahapon, ang Bagal ng Bukas (1985)
 Aliwan Paradise (1992)
 Southern Winds (1993)
 Bayaning Third World (2000)
 Citizen Jake (2018)

Film production companies of the Philippines